Gore Metal is the debut full-length album from American death metal band Exhumed, released by Relapse Records on October 27, 1998. It has been described as "totally disgusting". It is their only album until 2017's Death Revenge to feature bassist Ross Sewage.

Background
According to founding member Matt Harvey, Gore Metal was the album where Exhumed developed its vision, although he conceded that "we were still very loose and sloppy and didn't really have a handle on recording at all. Listening back to that record, I like most of the songs, but the production is awful sounding."

The band recorded several songs for the album that were lost when producer James Murphy, then suffering from brain cancer and acting "erratically", was evicted from his studio in Oakland.

Track listing
All songs written by Matt Harvey, except where noted.

Legacy
MetalStorm wrote: "Gore Metal features a more melodic sound with catchy riffs and often involves three distinct vocalists, sort of like old Carcass. This album would soon go on to inspire thousands of clone bands who would play the same type of music."

Personnel
Exhumed
Matt Harvey – guitars, high vocals
Col Jones – drums
Ross Sewage – bass, low vocals
Mike Beams – guitars
Additional personnel
Dave Shirk – mastering
James Murphy – mixing
Maurice Acevedo – engineering
Brian Henry – design, layout

References

Exhumed (band) albums
1998 debut albums
Relapse Records albums